Aliabad (also Romanized as ‘Alīābād and Alīābād) is a village in Qarah Bagh Rural District, in the Central District of Shiraz County, Fars Province, Iran. At the 2006 census, its population was 895, in 224 families.

References 

Populated places in Shiraz County